Kolqışlaq (also, Kolkyshlak and Kolkyshlakh) is a village in the Agdam Rayon of Azerbaijan.  The village forms part of the municipality of Qərvənd.

References 

Populated places in Aghdam District